Mark Arnold may refer to:

 Mark Arnold (actor) (born 1957), American actor
 Mark Arnold (volleyball) (born 1964), American volleyball player
 Mark Arnold (musician) (born 1966), American punk rock singer
 Mark Arnold (historian) (born 1966), American writer and commentator

See also
 Mark Arnold-Forster (1920–1981), writer and journalist
 Marc Arnold (born 1970), South African footballer